Aventin was a French saint and hermit of the 8th century.

Aventin may also refer to:

People
 Aventin (given name), a Russian given name
 Christine Aventin (born 1971), a French-language Belgian writer
 Diego Aventín (born 1980), an Argentine racing driver
 Oscar Aventín (born 1946), a retired Argentine race car driver
 Johannes Aventinus (1477–1534), Bavarian historian

Other uses
 Saint-Aventin, a commune in the Haute-Garonne department in southwestern France